Barbara Castleton (September 14, 1894 – December 23, 1978) was an American silent film actress. Castleton appeared in motion pictures from 1914 through 1923, accumulating 28 screen credits.

Career
Born in Little Rock, Arkansas, Castleton was one of the lower echelon stars who made films for Samuel Goldwyn Studio, along with Cullen Landis, James Kirkwood, and Rowland Lee. The company's major stars were Madge Kennedy, Geraldine Farrar, Will Rogers, and Tom Moore. Her first performance as a film actress came in The Ordeal (1914). She had the lead in Branding Iron (1920), a film directed by Reginald Barker.

Personal life and death
Her first husband was George W. Zimmerman, an attorney from Vancouver, British Columbia. Castleton won a divorce suit from Zimmerman in October 1921 in Reno, Nevada. She contended that he gambled and lived beyond his income. The decree was granted on ground of cruelty. Castleton wed playwright Willard Mack in June 1920.

Castleton was a collector of furniture. In March 1923, she purchased a pair of early 17th century blue velvet armchairs with Van Dyke fringe and a 17th century octagonal walnut center table with an elaborate carved base. The pieces were purchased at the Dabissi sale of fine old furniture held at the American Art Galleries in New York City.

Castleton died in Boca Raton, Florida in 1978.

Filmography

References

Los Angeles Times, "Willard Mack to Wed", June 18, 1920, Page III4.
Los Angeles Times, "Barbara Castleton Wins Divorce Suit", October 9, 1921, II10.
Los Angeles Times, "Film Publicist's Memories", July 22, 1958, Page B4.
The New York Times, "Dabissi Art Brings $58,695", March 25, 1923, Page 17.

External links

Barbara Castleton photo at NYP Library

1894 births
1978 deaths
American film actresses
American silent film actresses
Actresses from Little Rock, Arkansas
20th-century American actresses